The Best American Short Stories 2000 is a volume in The Best American Short Stories series. It was edited by Katrina Kenison and by guest editor E. L. Doctorow.

Short stories included

Notes

2000 anthologies
Fiction anthologies
Short Stories 2000
Houghton Mifflin books